The 2008 Miller Superbike World Championship round was the sixth round of the 2008 Superbike World Championship. It took place on the weekend of May 30-June 1, 2008, at the Salt Lake City circuit.

Superbike race 1 classification

Superbike race 2 classification

Notes
Jakub Smrz was disqualified in Race 2 for exiting the pits when the pitlane was already closed.
Miller Round
Miller